The 2008–09 Copa Indonesia was the fourth edition of Piala Indonesia, the nationwide football cup tournament in Indonesia, involving clubs from Indonesia Super League, Premier Division and First Division. Sriwijaya FC was the tournament's defending champions. The winner of the tournament qualified to play for 2010 AFC Champions League qualification.

Sriwijaya became champions for the second year in a row after a 4-0 victory over Persipura Jayapura in the final match at Jakabaring Stadium, Palembang.

First round 
Sriwijaya, Persipura Jayapura, Persija Jakarta and Pelita Jaya received byes to third round.

|}

Second round 

|}

Third round 

|}

Quarterfinal 

|}

Semifinal 

|}

Final

References

External links
Official site Liga Indonesia

2009
Copa Indonesia
Copa Indonesia
2008–09 in Indonesian football